Félix Danilo Gómez Bosquez (born August 29, 1980), known by his stage names Flex and Nigga, is a Panamanian reggaeton singer and songwriter. He adopted the name  Nigga after being told by another Panamanian artist that he "sings like a black guy from Jamaica." Before releasing an album in the United States in 2008, Flex removed references to his nickname in songs, and his CD packages were reprinted with the name "Flex."

Musical career

Early years
He began his musical career in 1997 with a song entitled "Como puedo cantar" in a duet with Toby King, which belonged to Pucho Bustamente's Da Crew album. But it was not until the year 2000 when he became known, appearing together with other artists on the album: Las Propias 2000 of the radio station Fabulosa Stereo and the producer Celia Torres. Being at that time where he recorded the song "Déjala" with Duende which managed to be placed in the rankings of countries such as: United States, Guatemala, Nicaragua, Venezuela and Peru. Then, without having finished the recording of that album, the producer asked him to record a song on the occasion of Mother's Day in Panama called "La balada de Nigga", although after the recording it was learned that his mother had died due to an expired medication in dialysis treatment. On that album a ballad version was recorded and then a reggae version on the album Deat Match where he would also record "Si tu me amaras". Later he recorded the song with the singer Catherine "Hasta cuando tendré que sufrir". Later he released an album with the title of Triple X that managed to break sales records in Ecuador. From this album comes the single "Si no te Tengo" also known as "En este mundo" that was playing on Ecuadorian radio for approximately 8 months.

In 2003 he performed more than 40 concerts in Mexico and shared the stage with Tranzas, Ecualizate, Los Subversivos, among others. In that same year he was in a musical group called Rocky Yes that was made up of Panamanian singers: El Friend, Duende and El Aspirante, with which he managed to record 25 songs including "Amigo", "Tienes que olvidarla", "Déjala" and "Vivir sin ti."

Consecration 
In 2007 he released his first solo album called Te Quiero: Romantic Style in da World which received a review of two and a half stars out of a total of five by the Allmusic web portal. The album was certified double platinum by AMPROFON in Mexico. The first single from this record material called "Te Quiero" reached #1 on Hot Latin Songs and #86 on Billboard Hot 100, both Billboard charts. With all this achieved, the Panamanian performed duets with Juan Luis Guerra, Daddy Yankee, Wisin & Yandel, Sean Kingston and Rihanna.

On November 13, 2008, he won his first Latin Grammy with the song "Te Quiero" in the category of Best Urban Song. In addition to this, he managed to win the prize in the National America category of the 40 Principal Awards of Spain as Best Artist of Panama. He also participated in the television program El Show de los Sueños of Televisa in its second season, where he won second place, however he was eliminated in the next stage which was called Los Reyes del Show. In that same year he had a brief foray into acting by having a special participation in the television series Central de abastos and the song "Te Quiero" served as the soundtrack.

In 2009 he released his second album entitled La Evolución Romantic Style with the promotion of the singles "Dime si te vas con él", "Te Dejaré" and "Te amo tanto" that had a special edition. The album charted at #1 on Latin Rhythm Albums and #3 on Top Latin Albums. During that year he won 8 of 13 nominations at the Billboard Music Awards, surpassing great artists such as Enrique Iglesias, Maná and Luis Fonsi.

Decadence and discographic blockade 
In 2010 he released the third album of the Romantic Style series called Romantic Style Parte 3: Desde La Esencia which debuted at #25 on the Top Latin Albums, becoming his lowest debut on the US charts. Unidos compared to their previous albums.

In 2012 he released his fourth studio album called "Vives en mi" through Emi Latin. This album was not as successful as his previous albums, as it was blocked by Sony Music, which had been the subsidiary of EMI Televisa Music and was the previous Flex discography. In addition, this was his last album distributed in Mexico, due to its record block. Shortly after being blocked by said discography, he returned to Panama with the aim of enhancing his musical career. In that year he collaborated with the Puerto Rican duo Alexis & Fido on the single "Contéstame el teléfono" which was nominated for the Lo Nuestro Awards in the category of Best Urban Song, although it would not ultimately win.

Later Years 
In 2013, he was the winner of the talent show Tu cara me suena in his first season in Panama. Since then, she continued to collaborate with other singers, among her, the most relevant was "No te pedí de más" with Makano.

In 2015 he released his sixth studio album called Seduction under the distribution of Sony Music. The album was moderately successful as it peaked at #2 on Billboard's Latin Rhythm Albums chart for two consecutive weeks. From that album came the single "Nadie como tú", which was ranked #20 on the Latin Pop Airplay. In that year he made a relevant collaboration on the single "Disfruta la vida" with the Spanish singer Antonio Barullo and the Puerto Rican rapper J Álvarez, which earned him another nomination for the 2017 Lo Nuestro Award in the category of Collaboration of the Year - Urban, but again without winning.

In 2018, he made his musical return to Mexico after being blocked by his old discography, premiering the single "Cerquita de mi" with Mexican singer Ricky Rick.

In 2019 he resumed his musical career as an independent artist with the single "Me enamore de ti". In the years to come, he released several singles, which did not achieve the same success as when he was at the height of his musical career. However, on May 14, 2021, he released his sixth studio album on all digital platforms called Delirio with a total of 12 songs and without any collaboration.

Disputes 
The artistic name that Félix adopted sparked controversy and was harshly criticized in the United States, as "Nigga" is an adjective that can be used pejoratively and derogatorily in another form. At the end of 2007, at the advice of his manager and to end the controversy, he changes his name from "Nigga" to "Flex" in order to be accepted in the Anglo-Saxon community. The parts where they mentioned their old name were edited and reprinted on their CD packaging in the North American country.

On March 10, 2021, there was an altercation with the Puerto Rican rapper Darell, who released a video on his social networks asking the Panamanian producer El Chombo to revive Flex, who was well dead in the music scene. That testimony caused inconvenience in the fans of Flex and in the entire public of Panama, who responded to Darell and even wrote to him on his personal Instagram account that he could not speak ill of a singer who had won eight Billboard awards of the Latin music and a Latin Grammy, nor should he speak ill of the Romantic Stye or the music of Panama and that he was only known in Panama for his participation in the single "Otro trago" by Sech, precisely who is also Panamanian.

Awards and accomplishments
Flex has received nominations for a variety of awards shows including Premios Billboard, Premios lo Nuestro, Latin Grammys, Premios Juventud, Premios Oye, and Premios Monitor Latino. Flex has won an Oye award, a Latin Grammy, and eight Billboard Latin Music awards.

His accomplishments include a number one position in Mexican and American radio for over 20 weeks, as well as Gold and Platinum album sales worldwide.

Personal life
After five years of dating, Flex married his long-time girlfriend Osiris Vega on August 26, 2008, and got divorced in 2011.  Flex continues to live in Panama.

Discography

Studio albums
2007: Te Quiero: Romantic Style in da World
2009: La Evolución Romantic Style
2010: Romantic Style Parte 3: Desde La Esencia
2012: Vives En Mí
2015: Seduction

EPs
2009: AOL Dejando Huellas

Compilation albums
2011: A Todo Romantic Style

Accolades

Billboard Latin Music Awards 

|-
!scope="row" rowspan="13"| 2009
|rowspan="7"|"Te Quiero"
|Hot Latin Song of the Year
|
|-
|Hot Latin Song of the Year, Male
|
|-
|Hot Latin Song of the Year, New
|
|-
|Latin Pop Airplay Song of the Year
|
|-
|Tropical Airplay Song of the Year, Male
|
|-
|Latin Rhythm Airplay Song of the Year, Solo
|
|-
|Latin Ringmaster of the Year
|
|-
|rowspan="2"|Himself
|Hot Latin Song Artist of the Year, Male
|
|-
|Top Latin Albums Artist of the Year
|
|-
|rowspan="4"|Te Quiero: Romantic Style In Da World
|Latin Album of the Year
|
|-
|Top Latin Album of the Year, Male
|
|-
|Top Latin Album of the Year, New
|
|-
|Latin Rhythm Album of the Year, Solo
|
|}

Latin Grammy Awards 

|-
!scope="row" rowspan="2"| 2008
|Te Quiero: Romantic Style In Da World
|Best Urban Music Album
|
|-
|"Te Quiero"
|Best Urban Song
|
|}

Lo Nuestro Awards 

|-
!scope="row" rowspan="3"| 2009
|Te Quiero: Romantic Style In Da World
|Urban Album of the Year
|
|-
|Himself
|Urban Artist of the Year
|
|-
|"Te Quiero"
|Urban Song of the Year
|
|-
!scope="row" rowspan="3"| 2010
|La Evolución Romantic Style
|Urban Album of the Year
|
|-
|Himself
|Urban Artist of the Year
|
|-
|"Dime Si Te Vas Con Él"
|Urban Song of the Year
|
|-
!scope="row"| 2017
|"Disfruta La Vida"Joint nomination with Antonio Barullo and J Álvarez
|Urban Collaboration of the Year
|
|}

References

1980 births
Living people
21st-century Panamanian male singers
21st-century Panamanian singers
People from Panama City
People from Chitré
Panamanian reggaeton musicians
Panamanian songwriters
Latin Grammy Award winners
EMI Televisa Music artists
Latin music songwriters